Charax Alexandri was a place in ancient Phrygia, near Celaenae, which was famed as a camp of Alexander the Great during his progress through Asia Minor, and afterward bore his name.

References

Former populated places in Turkey
Populated places in Phrygia
Wars of Alexander the Great
Lost ancient cities and towns